RHLI may refer to:
 The Royal Hamilton Light Infantry (Wentworth Regiment)
 Acyl-homoserine-lactone synthase, an enzyme